Gary Lee Taylor (born December 8, 1938) is a retired United States district judge of the United States District Court for the Central District of California.

Education and career

Born Gary Lee Hoisington in Los Angeles, California in 1938 his last name was changed to Taylor in 1945 when he was adopted. Taylor received an Artium Baccalaureus degree from the University of California, Los Angeles in 1960, and a Juris Doctor from the UCLA School of Law in 1963.

In 1963 he served as an assistant to the Dean of Foreign Students at the University of California, Los Angeles.

He served in the Judge Advocate General's Corps of the United States Army from 1964 to 1966, and was thereafter in private practice until 1986. He was a Judge on the Orange County Superior Court from 1986 to 1990.

Federal judicial service

On August 3, 1990, Taylor was nominated by President George H. W. Bush to a seat on the United States District Court for the Central District of California vacated by Judge Ferdinand Francis Fernandez. Taylor was confirmed by the United States Senate on September 28, 1990 and received his commission on October 1, 1990. He assumed senior status on December 8, 2004, and retired from the bench entirely on July 1, 2005. He is currently associated with Judicial Arbitration & Mediation Services.

References

Sources
FJC Bio

1938 births
Living people
California state court judges
Judges of the United States District Court for the Central District of California
United States district court judges appointed by George H. W. Bush
20th-century American judges
University of California, Los Angeles alumni
UCLA School of Law alumni
United States Army officers
Superior court judges in the United States